MCIFA may refer to:
MCIFA, the Michael Crawford International Fan Association
MCIfA, postnominal letters for Member of the Chartered Institute for Archaeologists